The Chinese Taipei Ice Hockey Federation (CTIHF) is the governing body of ice hockey in the Republic of China (Taiwan).

National teams

Men
Men U20
Men U18
Women

Participation by year

2017

2018

Leagues
Chinese Taipei Ice Hockey League

References

External links

Ice hockey in Taiwan
Ice hockey governing bodies in Asia
International Ice Hockey Federation members
Ice Hockey
Sports organizations established in 1983